Pachylobius is a genus of pine weevils in the beetle family Curculionidae. There are at least two described species in Pachylobius.

Species
These two species belong to the genus Pachylobius:
 Pachylobius picivorus (Germar, 1824) i c b (pitch-eating weevil)
 Pachylobius stupidus LeConte, J.L., 1876 c
Data sources: i = ITIS, c = Catalogue of Life, g = GBIF, b = Bugguide.net

References

Further reading

 
 
 

Molytinae
Articles created by Qbugbot